MŠK Kysucké Nové Mesto is a Slovak football team, based in the town of Kysucké Nové Mesto. The club was founded in 1948.

Honours

Domestic
Czechoslovakia
 1.SNL (1st Slovak National football league) (1969–1993)
 Winners (1): 1972-73

External links 
at sport.mkssknm.sk

References

Kysucke Nove Mesto
Association football clubs established in 1948
1948 establishments in Slovakia